The Iraqi Legal Database (ILD) is the first comprehensive and electronic legal database to be created in the Arab region.  The project to create the ILD was launched in 2004 by the United Nations Development Programme (UNDP), through its Programme on Governance in the Arab Region (POGAR). The project was implemented in cooperation with the Iraqi High Judicial Council.

See also

 United Nations Development Programme

References

External links 
The Iraqi Legal Database (-2013)
The Iraqi Legal Database (2014- )
The Programme on Governance in the Arab Region
United Nations Development Programme (Iraq Country Office)
The United Nations Assistance Mission for Iraq
Iraqi Local Governance Law Library

Government of Iraq
Law of Iraq
United Nations Development Programme
Online law databases
Databases in Iraq